Obadiah Benton McFadden (November 18, 1815 – June 25, 1875) was an American attorney and politician in the Pacific Northwest. He was the 8th justice of the Oregon Supreme Court, temporarily serving on the court to replace Matthew Deady. A Pennsylvania native, he later was a legislator in the Washington Territory, and he served in Congress representing that territory.

Early life
Obadiah McFadden was born in West Middletown, Pennsylvania on November 18, 1815. He was then educated locally in Washington County, Pennsylvania at the public schools and at McKeever Academy. Then in 1837 he married Margaret Caldwell. By 1843 he had been admitted to the bar allowing him to practice law.

Politics
In 1853, U.S. President Franklin Pierce appointed McFadden a justice of the Oregon Supreme Court during the territorial period on a temporary assignment to replace Matthew Deady. His term ended in 1854 and he left the Oregon court. At the time he was one of three justices on the bench of the court. 

In 1854, he was appointed to the Washington Supreme Court when Washington Territory was created out of Oregon Territory. While on that court he served as Chief Justice from 1858 to 1861. In 1861, he would become the president of the Washington Legislature's Council Chamber and would serve on that body until 1864 representing Thurston, Lewis and Chehalis counties. From 1855 to 1856, he fought in the Yakima War against the Yakima Indians.

Later years
McFadden then returned to private law practice, setting up office in Olympia, Washington.  Then in 1872 he was elected as a Democrat to represent the territory in the 43rd United States Congress. He served as a delegate from March 4, 1873 to March 3, 1875, and was not a candidate for renomination to the position. McFadden died in Olympia on June 25, 1875 and was buried at the Masonic Cemetery.

References

1815 births
1875 deaths
Justices of the Oregon Supreme Court
Members of the Washington Territorial Legislature
Justices of the Washington Supreme Court
Delegates to the United States House of Representatives from Washington Territory
Washington (state) Democrats
People from Washington County, Pennsylvania
19th-century American politicians
19th-century American judges